The St Andrews Trophy is a biennial men's team golf tournament contested between teams of amateur golfers representing Great Britain & Ireland and the Continent of Europe. It takes its name from St Andrews in Scotland.

It was first played in 1956 and takes place in even-numbered years; Great Britain & Ireland plays in the United States in the Walker Cup in odd-numbered years. It is staged alternately in Great Britain & Ireland and on the Continent, and is organised by The R&A (an offshoot of The Royal and Ancient Golf Club of St Andrews) and the European Golf Association. The St Andrews Trophy itself was presented by the Royal and Ancient Club in 1963.

The event is played on two consecutive days. On both days there are four morning foursomes followed by afternoon singles, eight on the first day and nine on the second.

History
The first event was held at Wentworth on 20 and 21 October 1956 and followed a similar format to that used for the Joy Cup which featured professional golfers. The teams were called the British Isles and the Rest of Europe. There were five foursomes on the first day and ten singles on the second. All matches were over 36 holes. The British Isles used the same ten players on both days, while the Rest of Europe used a total of twelve players. The British Isles won all five matches on the first day and finished 12½–2½ winners.

The second event was held at Golf de Saint-Cloud in France on 2 and 3 October 1958, retaining the same format as in 1956. Britain used 11 players while the Rest of Europe used 12 as they had in 1956. The British Isles won four of the five foursomes on the first day and, although the Rest of Europe won four singles, Britain won comfortably, 10–5. In 1960 it was held at the Berkshire Golf Club on 3 and 4 September. With 12 players from the Rest of Europe attending, it was decided to extend the format to include six foursomes and twelve singles, all 12 in each team playing both days. Britain won the foursomes 5–1 and the singles 8–4 to win convincingly.

The 1962 event was held at Halmstad GK in Tylösand, Sweden on 11 and 12 August. Matches were reduced to 18 holes with five foursomes and ten singles on each day. Teams were standardised to 11 players. Great Britain and Ireland won the foursomes sessions 4½–½ and 4–1 and, although the Continent of Europe tied the first-day singles and won the second set of singles 5½–4½, Great Britain and Ireland won 18–12 thanks to their domination of the foursomes. The next tournament was held on 31 July and 1 August 1964 at Muirfield and was the first time the St Andrews trophy was contested. Great Britain and Ireland led 12–3 and won by a large margin, 23–7. The 1966 event was held at Real Sociedad de Golf de Neguri near Bilbao, Spain on 29 and 30 July. Although Great Britain and Ireland won the first-day foursomes 4–1, the singles and the second-day foursomes were both tied. The Continent of Europe could have won the match with a good final session but they lost the first seven singles matches and the final result was 19½–10½.

Portmarnock Golf Club in Ireland was the host for the 1968 match, held on 2 and 3 August. The match was very one-sided with Great Britain and Ireland leading 12½–2½ after the first day and winning 20–10, despite losing the final singles 6–4. The 1970 event was held at Royal Zoute Golf Club, Belgium on 1 and 2 August. Great Britain and Ireland won all five foursomes on the first morning but after the Continent had won the singles and the second-day foursomes, Britain only led 10½–9½. The Continent were however only able to win three second-day singles and Britain won 17½–12½. The Berkshire was the venue for the 1972 match, played on 4 and 5 August. The Continent won the first set of foursomes 3–2 but Britain won the singles 8½–1½ and the second-day foursomes 4–1 to take a convincing lead. The second set of singles was tied to give Great Britain and Ireland a 19½–10½ win, their ninth successive victory.

The Continent of Europe had their first success on 2 and 3 August 1974 at Golf Club Punta Ala on the Tuscan coast in Italy. On the first day the foursomes were tied but the Continent won the singles and led 8–7, the first time they had been ahead after the first day. On the second day the Continent won the foursomes 3–2  and with 5 wins in the singles they took the trophy by a 16–14 margin. The Old Course at St Andrews hosted the 1976 match, played on 30 and 31 July. Although the Continent lost 18½–11½, it was their best performance on British soil. The 1978 event was held on 4 and 5 August at Club zur Vahr in Bremen, Germany. Britain won comfortably by a margin of 20½–9½. Royal St George's Golf Club hosted the 1980 match, played on 27 and 28 June. Great Britain and Ireland led 12–3 after the first day and had ensured success after leading 16–4 after the second-day foursomes. The Continent won the second-day singles session, Britain winning by a score of 19½–10½.

The format was revised in 1982 with only four foursomes and eight singles on each day. Teams were reduced from 11 to 9. The Continent of Europe gained their second success. The match was played at Rosendaelsche Golfclub, Arnhem in the Netherlands on 25 and 26 June. The Continent led 8–4 after the first day. On the second day they halved both the sessions and won 14–10. The 1984 match, played on 30 and 31 May at Saunton Golf Club, was the first time the Continent came close to winning in Britain. Great Britain and Ireland led 6½–5½ after the first day and 8½–7½ after the second-day foursomes. In the afternoon five of the eight singles went to the final green with Britain winning two of these and halving the other three, giving Britain a close 13–11 win. Halmstad hosted the event for the second time on 27 and 28 June 1986. The Continent had an immediate disadvantage when Anders Haglund, who had the inaugural European Amateur earlier in the year, had to withdraw because of illness. This meant that the same eight players had to play in each session. Britain won the first-day singles 7–1 to lead 9–3. The Continent won the second-day foursomes but Britain again won the singles for a 14½–9½ win.

The 1988 match was held at St Andrews on 29 and 30 June. Great Britain and Ireland led 7½–4½ after the first day and won easily, 15½–8½.

The 2020 match was cancelled due to the COVID-19 pandemic in the United Kingdom.

Results

Future venues
2024 - Royal Porthcawl, Wales

Appearances
The following are those who have played in at least one of the matches.

Great Britain and Ireland

  Neil Anderson 1988
  Harry Ashby 1974
  Michael Attenborough 1966, 1968
  Sam Bairstow 2022
  Peter Baker 1986
  Roger Beames 1996
  John Beharrell 1956
  Peter Benke 1970
  Warren Bennett 1994
  Peter Berry 1972
  Findlay Black 1966
  Warren Bladon 1996
  Michael Bonallack 1958, 1960, 1962, 1964, 1966, 1968, 1970, 1972
  David Boote 2016
  Wallace Booth 2008
  Jamie Bower 2016
  Gordon Brand Jnr 1976, 1978, 1980
  Paul Broadhurst 1988
  Allan Brodie 1974, 1976, 1978, 1980
  Colin Brooks 1986
  Michael Brooks 1996
  Sam Brough 1960
  Barclay Brown 2022
  Raymond Burns 1992
  Alan Bussell 1956, 1962
  James Byrne 2010
  Ian Caldwell 1956, 1960
  Jonathan Caldwell 2008
  Hugh Campbell 1964
  Laurie Canter 2010
  David Carrick 1986
  Joe Carr 1956, 1968
  Iain Carslaw 1978
  Jim Carvill 1990
  Paul Casey 2000
  Craig Cassells 1990
  Brian Chapman 1962
  Roger Chapman 1980
  Ashley Chesters 2014
  Martin Christmas 1960, 1962, 1964
  Darren Clarke 1990
  Clive Clark 1964
  Gordon Clark 1964, 1966
  Graeme Clark 2002
  Todd Clements 2018
  Andrew Coltart 1990
  Lee Corfield 2004
  Tom Corridan 1984
  Gordon Cosh 1966, 1968
  Tom Craddock 1958, 1966, 1968
  Bruce Critchley 1970
  David Curry 1986, 1988
  Paul Cutler 2010
  Colin Dalgleish 1982
  Archie Davies 2022
  John Davies 1972, 1974, 1976, 1978
  Rhys Davies 2006
  Robin Dawson 2018
  Peter Deeble 1978
  Robert Dinwiddie 2006
  Luke Donald 1998, 2000
  Jamie Donaldson 2000
  Nick Dougherty 2000
  Paul Downes 1980
  Bradley Dredge 1994
  Alan Dunbar 2012
  George Duncan 1956
  Paul Dunne 2014
  Simon Dyson 1998
  Nigel Edwards 2002, 2004, 2006
  Arron Edwards-Hill 2022
  Bobby Eggo 1988
  Matthew Ellis 1996
  Jamie Elson 2002
  Duncan Evans 1980
  Ryan Evans 2014
  Richard Eyles 1974
  Jody Fanagan 1992, 1996
  David Fisher 1994
  Oliver Fisher 2006
  Grant Forrest 2014, 2016
  Rodney Foster 1964, 1966, 1968, 1970
  Noel Fox 2000
  David Frame 1958, 1960
  Mark Gannon 1974, 1978
  Ian Garbutt 1992
  David Gilford 1986
  Graham Gordon 2002
  John Gough 2022
  Charlie Green 1962, 1966, 1968, 1970, 1972, 1974, 1976
  Scott Gregory 2016
  Stuart Grehan 2016
  David Hague 2018
  Matt Haines 2008
  Pádraig Harrington 1992, 1994
  Max Harris 2000
  John Hawksworth 1984
  Garry Hay 1980
  James Heath 2004
  Peter Hedges 1974, 1976
  Craig Hinton 2012
  Trevor Homer 1972
  Barclay Howard 1980, 1994, 1996
  Gordon Huddy 1960
  Jack Hume 2016
  Warren Humphreys 1970
  Gary Hurley 2014
  Ian Hutcheon 1974, 1976
  Sam Hutsby 2008
  Reid Jack 1956
  Lee S. James 1994
  Richard Johnson 1994
  Matthew Jordan 2018
  Raymond Kane 1974
  Ross Kellett 2010
  Michael Kelley 1976, 1978, 1982
  Lorne Kelly 1998
  Stephen Keppler 1982
  Nathan Kimsey 2012
  Michael King 1970, 1972
  Craig Laurence 1984
  Tom Lewis 2010
  Mark Loftus 2000
  Shane Lowry 2008
  Michael Lunt 1958, 1960, 1964
  Jon Lupton 2002
  Sandy Lyle 1976
  Callum Macaulay 2008
  Scott Macdonald 1970
  George Macgregor 1970, 1974, 1984
  Keith Macintosh 1980
  Robert MacIntyre 2016
  Simon Mackenzie 2002
  David Madeley 1962
  Brian Marchbank 1976, 1978
  Geoff Marks 1968, 1970
  David Marsh 1958
  Nick Marsh 2014
  Steve Martin 1976
  Paul Mayo 1986
  Andrew McArthur 2004
  Matthew McClean 2022
  Peter McEvoy 1978, 1980, 1984, 1986, 1988
  Garth McGimpsey 1984, 1986, 1988, 1990, 1992
  Ross McGowan 2006
  Rory McIlroy 2006
  Paul McKellar 1978
  Jamie McLeary 2004
  John Metcalfe 1990
  Jim Milligan 1988, 1990, 1992
  Angus Moir 1984
  Colin Montgomery 1986
  Peter Moody 1972
  Robert Moran 2022
  Jamie Moul 2006
  Pat Mulcare 1972
  John Murphy 2018
  Gordon Murray 1978
  Stuart Murray 1958, 1962
  Bradley Neil 2014
  Matthew Nixon 2010
  Keith Nolan 1996
  Eoghan O'Connell 1988
  Steven O'Hara 2000
  Andrew Oldcorn 1982
  Bryan Omelia 1998
  Peter Oosterhuis 1968
  Sam Osborne 2004
  Chris Paisley 2008
  Philip Parkin 1984
  David Patrick 1998
  Jim Payne 1990
  Eddie Pepperell 2010
  Gian-Marco Petrozzi 2018
  Kevin Phelan 2012
  Arthur Pierse 1980, 1982
  Sandy Pirie 1970
  Alfie Plant 2016
  Nick Poppleton 2018
  Garrick Porteous 2012
  John Povall 1962
  Mark Power 2022
  Rhys Pugh 2012
  Conor Purcell 2018
  Ronan Rafferty 1980
  Richie Ramsay 2006
  Graham Rankin 1998
  Neil Raymond 2012
  Matthew Richardson 2004
  Dean Robertson 1992
  Graeme Robertson 2012, 2014
  Neil Roderick 1988
  Sandy Saddler 1960, 1962, 1964, 1966
  Lloyd Saltman 2006
  Jamie Savage 2014
  Zane Scotland 2002
  Calum Scott 2022
  Doug Sewell 1958, 1960
  Ronnie Shade 1962, 1964, 1966, 1968
  David Sheahan 1962, 1964
  Alec Shepperson 1956, 1958, 1960
  Andrew Sherborne 1984
  Gordon Sherry 1994
  Martin Sludds 1982
  Billy Smith 1972
  Dickson Smith 1958
  Hugh Smyth 1976
  Matt Stanford 1992
  Sandy Stephen 1972
  Michael Stewart 2010
  Hugh Stuart 1968, 1972, 1974
  Connor Syme 2016
  Keith Tate 1956
  Ben Taylor 2012
  Alan Thirlwell 1956, 1958, 1964
  Martin Thompson 1982
  Peter Townsend 1966
  Steven Uzzell 2008
  Mitch Waite 2018
  James Walker 1958, 1960
  Richard Walker 2002
  Philip Walton 1982
  Craig Watson 1998
  Dale Whitnell 2008
  Robert Wiggins 1996
  Craig Williams 1998
  Ricky Willison 1990
  Stuart Wilson 2004
  Gary Wolstenholme 1992, 1994, 1996, 1998, 2000, 2002, 2004
  Guy Wolstenholme 1956
  Darren Wright 2010
  Ian Young 1982
  John Young 1960

Continent of Europe

  José Luis Adarraga 2006
  Antti Ahokas 2006
  Björn Åkesson 2008
  Anton Albers 2022
  Fredrik Andersson 1992
  J Andersson 1960
  Alvaro Arana 1966
  Christian Aronsen 1998
  Morten Backhausen 1994
  Marius Bardana 1956, 1958, 1960
  Olivier Barras 1956, 1958, 1960
  Léonard Bem 2014
  Daniel Berna 2014
  Nadi Berruti 1958, 1960
  Nino Bertasio 2010
  Thomas Besancenez 2000
  Wil Besseling 2006
  Stefano Betti 1976
  Franco Bevione 1958
  Gustaf Adolf Bielke 1956, 1962
  Alberto Binaghi 1984
  Thomas Bjørn 1990
  Pietro Bovari 2022
  Heidar Bragason 2004
  Kalle Brink 1994
  Andrea Brotto 1996
  Walter Brühne 1966, 1968
  Jorge Campillo 2008
  Andrea Canessa 1980, 1982, 1984
  Ivan Cantero Gutierrez 2016
  Gunnar Carlander 1962
  Joao Carlota 2014
  Edgar Catherine 2018
  Didier Charmat 1970
  Luca Cianchetti 2016
  Julien Clément 2002
  Patrick Cotton 1974
  Martin Couvra 2022
  Alberto Croce 1964, 1966
  Patrick Cros 1962, 1964, 1966
  Alberto Croze 1974, 1976
  Emilio Cuartero 2014
  Daniel Da Costa Rodrigues 2022
  Baldovino Dassù 1970
  Olivier David 1998
  Nuno de Brito e Cunha 1968, 1972
  Henri de Lamaze 1956, 1958, 1960
  Eduardo de la Riva, Snr 1972, 1976, 1980, 1990
  Matteo Delpodio 2006
  José de Sousa e Mello 1972
  Erik Donnerstad 1972
  Diego Dupin 1994
  Marco Durante 1980
  Albert Eckhardt 2014
  Olivier Edmond 1990
  Mathias Eggenberger 2014
  Klas Eriksson 1990
  Martin Erlandsson 1996
  Édouard España 2012
  Niclas Fasth 1992
  Gonzalo Fernández-Castaño 2004
  Markus Frank 1982
  Hervé Frayssineau 1966
  Lorenzo Gagli 2006
  Mario Galiano Aguilar 2014, 2016
  José Gancedo 1968, 1970, 1972, 1974
  Jordi García del Moral 2006
  Alfredo García-Heredia 2002, 2004
  Sergio García 1996
  Ignacio Garrido 1992
  Ignacio Gervás 1984
  Ivó Giner 1996
  Alexis Godillot 1964, 1966, 1968, 1970, 1972, 1974, 1976, 1978, 1980, 1982
  Tim Gornik 2014
  Thomas Gottstein 1988
  Julien Grillon 2006
  Stephan Gross 2008
  Julien Guerrier 2006
  Mark Haastrup 2004
  Anders Haglund 1986^, 1988
  Marc Hammer 2018
  Chris Hanell 1994
  Herluf Hansen 1962
  Peter Hanson 1998
  Cristian Härdin 1986, 1988
  Benjamin Hébert 2008
  Hans Hedjerson 1968, 1970, 1976
  Ángel Hidalgo 2018
  Gabriel Hjertstedt 1990
  Yves Hofstetter 1974, 1976
  Mikael Högberg 1984
  Matias Honkala 2018
  François Illouz 1980, 1982, 1988
  Mikko Ilonen 2000
  Peter Jochums 1966, 1970
  P O Johansson 1962, 1964
  Claes Jöhncke 1962, 1966, 1968, 1970, 1972, 1974
  Úlfar Jónsson 1990
  Alexandre Kaleka 2008
  Rune Karlfeldt 1964
  Robert S. Karlsson 2012
  Martin Kaymer 2004
  Jesper Kennegård 2008, 2010
  Maximilian Kieffer 2010
  Krister Kinell 1982
  Jesper Kjaerbye 1994
  Espen Kofstad 2010
  Jeroen Krietemeijer 2016
  Panu Kylliäinen 1998, 2000
  Frédéric Lacroix 2018
  Maarten Lafeber 1996
  Roger Lagarde 1958, 1972
  Hans Lampert 1958, 1960
  Moritz Lampert 2012
  José Manuel Lara 1996
  Alejandro Larrazábal 2002
  Mika Lehtinen 1996
  Lennart Leinborn 1962
  Niklas Lemke 2002
  José-Filipe Lima 2002
  John Lindberg 1986, 1988
  Fredrik Lindgren 1984, 1988
  Antonio Lionello 1974, 1978
  Johann Lopez-Lazaro 2010
  David Lundgren 2022
  Göran Lundqvist 1976, 1978
  Jochen Lupprian 2000
  Morten Ørum Madsen 2010
  Stefano Maio 1998
  Luis Masaveu 2022
  Iván Maura 1956, 1958, 1966
  Stefano Mazzoli 2016, 2018
  Guido Migliozzi 2016
  Jacques Moerman 1956, 1958, 1960, 1970
  Edoardo Molinari 2004
  Francesco Molinari 2004
  Gaëtan Mourgue D'Algue 1962, 1964, 1966,  1968
  Rolf Muntz 1990, 1992
  Peter Möller 1962
  Jan-Gerhard Müller 1974, 1976
  Klaus Nierlich 1970, 1974
  Fredrik Niléhn 2018
  Enrico Nistri 1990
  Bart Nolte 1986
  José María Olazábal 1984
  Daniel Olsson 1996
  Thomas Ortner 2004
  Veit Pagel 1972, 1976, 1978, 1980
  Jesper Parnevik 1986
  Jacobo Pastor 2012
  Andrea Pavan 2008
  Magnus Persson 1982
  Robin Petersson 2016
  Carlos Pigem 2012
  Tim Planchin 1976, 1978, 1980
  Philippe Ploujoux 1982
  Tapio Pulkkanen 2012
  Borja Queipo de Llano 1988, 1990
  Raúl Quirós 1998
  Jacob Rasmussen 1980, 1984
  Christophe Ravetto 1996, 1998
  Stefano Reale 2000
  Franco Revione 1956
  Luis Rezola 1956
  Freddy Rodesch 1960, 1962, 1964, 1966, 1968
  Paul Rolin 1956, 1964
  Jan Rube 1976, 1978, 1980
  Johan Ryström 1986
  Nicasio Sagardia 1978
  Kalle Samooja 2010
  Francisco Sanchiz 1964
  Hugo Santos 2002
  Ricardo Santos 2004
  Reinier Saxton 2008
  Lorenzo Scalise 2018
  Massimo Scarpa 1992
  Jan-Erik Schapmann 1992
  Alberto Schiaffino 1958, 1964, 1968
  Laurenz Schiergen 2022
  Frank Schlig 1984
  Marcel Schneider 2012
  Ulrich Schulte 1982
  Tino Schuster 2000
  Matthias Schwab 2016
  Erik Sellschopp 1956, 1960, 1962
  Daniel Silva 1986, 1988
  Lorenzo Silva 1964, 1966
  Timo Sipponen 1980
  Tim Sluiter 2008
  Anders Sørensen 1982
  Thomas Sørensen 2012
  Mikael Sorling 1978
  Maximilian Steinlechner 2022
  Henrik Stenson 1998
  Christian Strenger 1974, 1978
  Sven Strüver 1988
  Nicolas Sulzer 2002
  Thomas Sundström 2002
  Björn Svedin 1980
  Tore Sviland 1984
  Victor Swane 1972
  Eric Tavernier 1958, 1960
  Roman Taya 1970, 1972, 1974, 1978
  Jacques Thalamy 2000
  Michael Thannhäuser 1998, 2000
  Niels Thygesen 1956, 1958
  Philippe Toussaint 1968, 1970
  Manuel Trappel 2012
  Damian Ulrich 2006
  Francisco Valera 1992, 1994
  Erkki Välimaa 1986
  Sami Välimäki 2018
  Darius van Driel 2014
  Jean van de Velde 1986
  Nicolas Vanhootegem 1992, 1994
  Rafael Vera 2000
  Victor Veyret 2016
  Adam Wallin 2022
  Philippe Washer 1960
  Romain Wattel 2010
  Jürgen Weghmann 1968
  Elis Werkell 1956, 1960
  Leif Westerberg 1994
  Pontus Widegren 2010
  Martin Wiegele 2002
  Manny Zerman 1992
  Niki Zitny 1994

See also
Vagliano Trophy – the equivalent event for women (since 1959)
Jacques Léglise Trophy – the equivalent event for boys (since 1958)
Seve Trophy – the equivalent event for professionals (2000–2013)

References

External links
EGA coverage
R&A coverage
EGA Results Archive

Team golf tournaments
Amateur golf tournaments in the United Kingdom
R&A championships